Polyptychopsis is a genus of moths in the family Sphingidae. It contains only one species, Polyptychopsis marshalli, which is known from Brachystegia woodland in large parts of Africa.

The wingspan is 53–58 mm.

Subspecies
Polyptychopsis marshalli marshalli (Zimbabwe to Malawi and south-eastern Tanzania)
Polyptychopsis marshalli auriguttatus (Gehlen, 1934) (Democratic Republic of the Congo, south-western Tanzania and probably eastern Angola)
Polyptychopsis marshalli meridianus (Kernbach, 1963) (Zimbabwe)

References

Smerinthini
Monotypic moth genera
Lepidoptera of the Democratic Republic of the Congo
Moths of Sub-Saharan Africa
Lepidoptera of Angola
Lepidoptera of Malawi
Lepidoptera of Tanzania
Lepidoptera of Zimbabwe
Taxa named by Robert Herbert Carcasson
Miombo